Encadenados (English title: Notorious) is a Mexican telenovela produced by Ernesto Alonso for Televisa in 1988. Its original story of Marissa Garrido was based on Wuthering Heights by British author Emily Brontë and directed by Julio Castillo.

Christian Bach and Humberto Zurita starred as protagonists, while Sergio Jiménez, Julieta Rosen and Leonardo Daniel starred as antagonists.

Cast 

 Christian Bach as Catalina Valdecasas
 Humberto Zurita as Germán
 Sergio Jiménez as Caralampio/José
 Julieta Rosen as Blanca Lazcano
 Raquel Olmedo as Alina
 Macaria as Isabel
 Miguel Ángel Ferriz as Eduardo Valdecasas
 Leonardo Daniel as Daniel Lazcano
 Marcela de Galina as Alejandra
 Tony Bravo as Carlos Montes
 Gabriela Goldsmith as Iris
 Arturo Benavides as Arnaldo
 Malena Doria as Bertha
 Fernando Moncada as Manuel
 María Montaño as Adela Lazcano
 Teo Tapia as Gilberto Lazcano
 César Adrián Sánchez as Toño
 Jorge Mondragón as Dr. Castellanos
 Julieta Egurrola as Jacinta
 María Eugenia Ríos as Natalia
 Alejandro Ruiz as Marcos
 Nailea Norvind as Mariela
 Graciela Döring as Felipa
 Bruno Rey as Alejandro Valdecasas
 María Marcela as Alejandra
 Fabiola Elenka Tapia as Catalina (child)
 Raúl Castro as Germán (child)
 Rafael Omar as Daniel (child)
 Farid Kuri as Eduardo (child)
 Renata de los Ríos as Blanca (child)
 Arturo Benavides as Arnaldo
 Aurora Medina as Aurelia
 Josafat Luna as Luis Alberto

Awards

References

External links

1988 telenovelas
Mexican telenovelas
1988 Mexican television series debuts
1989 Mexican television series endings
Spanish-language telenovelas
Television shows set in Mexico
Televisa telenovelas